The Flo-Bert Award honors "outstanding figures in the field of tap dance".

History
Named for eminent African-American performers Florence Mills and Bert Williams, the awards began in 1991. Flo-Bert, Ltd, the non-profit organization that makes the selections, was founded by historian and researcher Delilah Jackson in 1989. The organization is sponsored by the New York Foundation for the Arts.

The Flo-Bert Award is given annually. Honorees include Gregory Hines, Cab Calloway, Gene Kelly, Savion Glover, and the Nicholas Brothers. The award is meant to recognize life achievement in performing, teaching or supporting the art of tap dance.

The organization holds an awards show, The Tap Extravaganza. It is produced by The New York Committee to Celebrate National Tap Dance Day.

Honorees
listed alphabetically; year of award indicated

Jerry Ames, founder and artistic director of Jerry Ames Tap Dance Company; 2006
Maceo Anderson, original member of The Four Step Brothers, early innovator of the acrobatic tap style; 1994
Cholly Atkins, partner of Charles "Honi" Coles; Motown choreographer; 1993
Bob Audy; 2007
Jean Bach; 2008
Clayton "Peg Leg" Bates; 1991
John Bedford; 2006
Phil Black; 1996
Bunny Briggs; 1999
Ernest "Brownie" Brown, member of the Hoofer's Club, original member of The Original Copasetics, half of vaudeville duo Cook and Brown; 2003
Brenda Bufalino, creator and choreographer for the American and International Tap Dance Orchestras; 1999
Cab Calloway, dancer and bandleader; 1992
Lon Chaney; 1991
The Cotton Club Girls; 1992
Harold Cromer, Stumpy of the tap team Stump and Stumpy; 2005
Stanley Donen, film director (Singing in the Rain, Seven Brides for Seven Brothers); 2003
Paul Draper, partner of Larry Adler; 1993
Arthur Duncan; 2004
Mercedes Ellington, choreographer, dancer, producer; first black member of the June Taylor Dancers, granddaughter of Duke Ellington; 2009
Savion Glover, star of Bring in da Noise, Bring in da Funk; 2000
Yvette Glover, mother of Savion Glover; 2007
Jane Goldberg, tap performer and historian; 2002
Chuck Green; 1991
Ralph Guild; 2006
Lionel Hampton, musician; 1995
Barry Harris, pianist, composer and teacher; 1998
George Hillman; 1991
Gregory Hines, brother of Maurice Hines; 1998
Maurice Hines, brother of Gregory Hines; 2008
Milt Hinton, jazz bassist; 1997
Melba Huber; 1996
Delilah Jackson, founded Flo-Bert, Ltd. and the Flo-Bert Awards; 2001
Gene Kelly; 1994
Sali Ann Kriegsman; 1997
Mable Lee, singer-dancer, one of the original Apollo Girls; 2004
Jeni LeGon, member of the Whitman Sisters; 2001
Henry LeTang, taught Gregory Hines; choreographer of the movies Tap and The Cotton Club, Broadway plays Eubie, Black and Blue and Sophisticated Ladies; 1995
Bernard Manners; 1991
Frankie Manning, member of Whitey's Lindy Hoppers; 2004
Ann Miller; 1994
Deborah Mitchell, founder of the New Jersey Tap Ensemble; 2007
Cobi Narita; 2005
The Nicholas Brothers; 1992
Donald O'Connor; 1997
Frank Ownes, pianist/arranger/composer; 2002
Radio City Rockettes; 1996
Leonard Reed, inventor of the Shim Sham Shimmy; 2000
LaVaughn Robinson; 2005
Jo Rowan; 2006
The Silver Belles; 1992
Randy Skinner; 2010
Jimmy Slyde; 1991
Prince Spencer, one of the Four Step Brothers; 2009
Peggy Spina; 2008
Bross Townsend, pianist; 1996
Tommy Tune; 2003
Dianne Walker; 2003
George Wein, originator of the Newport Jazz Festival; 2004
Ruth Williams, founder of the Ruth Williams Dance Studio in Harlem; 1996
Heather Cornell, co-founder of Manhattan Tap; 2012

Notes

External links
 Flo-Bert Awards by Bill Egan at florencemills.com

Awards established in 1991
Dance awards
Tap dance
1991 establishments in New York City